Fifth Saeima of Latvia was the Parliament of the Republic of Latvia in the period from July 6, 1993 to November 6, 1995. It was the first Latvian Saeima since 1934, when the 4th Saeima ended. Until the 5th Saeima, the country was governed by the Supreme Council of the Republic of Latvia.

Elections and Parties 
The 5th Saeima elections took place on June 5 and 6, 1993. 23 political parties took part in the elections. 1,118,316 voters had voted, representing 89.9% of 1,243,956 eligible voters. 
The following 8 parties overcame the 4% barrier and entered the Saeima:
 Latvian Way - 36 seats
 Latvian National Independence Movement - 15 seats
 National Harmony Party - 13 places
 Latvian Farmers' Union - 12 seats
 Equal Rights - 7 seats
 For Fatherland and Freedom - 6 places
 Union of Christian Democrats - 6 seats
 Democratic Center Party - 5 seats

Activities of the 5th Saeima 
The Speaker of the 5th Saeima was Anatolijs Gorbunovs (Latvian Way). There were 15 commissions in the Saeima, as well as several sub-commissions and investigation commissions. 137 meetings were held in the Saeima, in which 839 laws were reviewed, the Satversme was renewed, the Law of 1925 "On the Structure of the Cabinet of Ministers" was adopted, the Citizenship Law, the Corruption Prevention Law were adopted, local government reform was passed, and an agreement on complete withdrawal of the Armed Forces of the Russian Federation was concluded.

During the 5th Saeima, the Cabinet of Ministers of Birkavs and the Cabinet of Ministers of Gailis.

References 

Political history of Latvia
Saeima